Kevin Ware Jr. (born September 30, 1980) is a former American football tight end in the National Football League (NFL) for the Washington Redskins and San Francisco 49ers. Ware was arrested for killing his girlfriend in July 2022.

Career
Born in San Diego, Ware played high school football at Klein Oak High School in Harris County, Texas, and college football at the University of Washington. 

He then played for the Washington Redskins in 2003 (11 games) and the San Francisco 49ers in 2004 (5 games), before being released in September.

Legal history 
In 2002, while at the University of Washington, Ware pleaded guilty to misdemeanor assault and received a suspended sentence. In 2010, in Houston, he was charged in two separate incidents with theft and with evading arrest after an assault.

In December 2018, Ware was sentenced to two years in prison for intent to manufacture or deliver a controlled substance, a first-degree felony.

On April 19, 2021, Ware was stopped for speeding in Magnolia, Texas. When his car was searched, drugs including cocaine, methamphetamine, marijuana, and a Xanax pill were found, and also a loaded AK-47 and a loaded 9mm pistol. Ware was arrested and charged with two counts of possession with intent to deliver a controlled substance, and with unlawful possession of a firearm as a felon, a third-degree felony in Texas; he was released from jail the following day after posting a $23,000 bond. 

Ware was arrested on June 11, 2021 in Spring, Texas, for violating his bail conditions. At the time, his 29-year-old girlfriend Taylor Pomaski was missing and last seen following a party at the couple's shared Spring residence on April 25, at which neighbors reported the couple had quarreled violently. Her remains were found in northern Harris County, Texas on December 10, 2021 and confirmed as Pomaski on May 1, 2022. Ware was indicted for murder and tampering with a corpse on July 28, 2022.

References

1980 births
Living people
American football tight ends
San Francisco 49ers players
Washington Huskies football players
Washington Redskins players
Sportspeople from Harris County, Texas
Players of American football from San Diego